Frederick Alexander MacDougall (November 2, 1818 – November 16, 1878) was the 14th Mayor of Los Angeles, from 1876 to 1878.  He was a physician and the first Los Angeles Chief of Police.  He died in 1878 in office and Bernard Cohn was appointed to be mayor for only 2 weeks.

References

Mayors of Los Angeles
1878 deaths
1818 births